Ivan Nikolov Pritargov (15 September 1952 – 25 January 2017) was a Bulgarian footballer. He played as a striker in the top level of Bulgarian league football for Chernomorets Burgas, Trakia Plovdiv and CSKA Sofia. Pritargov scored 108 goals in the A Group during his career.

Pritgarov died in January 2017 after suffering a stroke.

References

1952 births
2017 deaths
Bulgarian footballers
Bulgaria international footballers
FC Chernomorets Burgas players
Botev Plovdiv players
PFC CSKA Sofia players
First Professional Football League (Bulgaria) players
Sportspeople from Burgas
Association football forwards